The Women's 69 kilograms weightlifting event at the 2012 Summer Olympics in London, United Kingdom, took place at ExCeL London.

Summary
Total score was the sum of the lifter's best result in each of the snatch and the clean and jerk, with three lifts allowed for each lift.  In case of a tie, the lighter lifter won; if still tied, the lifter who took the fewest attempts to achieve the total score won.  Lifters without a valid snatch score did not perform the clean and jerk.

Maryna Shkermankova of Belarus originally won the bronze medal, but was disqualified in 2016 after a retest of her 2012 sample was positive for steroids, fourth-placed Dzina Sazanavets of Belarus was also disqualified for the same reason. Roxana Cocoș of Romania originally won the silver medal, but was disqualified in 2020 after a failed retest of her sample from 2012 tested positive for doping.

Schedule
All times are British Summer Time (UTC+01:00)

Records

 Liu Chunhong's world and Olympic records from the year 2008 were rescinded in 2017.

Results

References 

Weightlifting at the 2012 Summer Olympics
Olymp
Women's events at the 2012 Summer Olympics